
 
Duhabi is a Village Development Committee in Dhanusa District in the Janakpur Zone of south-eastern Nepal. At the time of the 1991 Nepal census it had a population of 5,762 persons residing in 990 individual households.

Duhabi is an archeological, historical, religious and cultural village situated either sides of indo-Nepal border. The natural environment of the Maithili cultural village includes a river, ponds, mango groove and the historical and archeological sites. It is a natural, cultural, and archeological museum. The word “Duhabi” is derived from the Sanskrit word , which means plant of grass family. It is said that Saint Durbasha meditated for 12 years only eating ‘Durba’ in the same village. So the Gadh [place of meditation] got its name Durbasha Gadh latter got its name Duhabi. Historically the archeological remains and icons [stone idols] excavated in the village resemble with archeological remains of Simraungadh and Rajbiraj this proves a historical linkage of Karnat era in Mithila described by the Chinese travelers Xuan Zang and Zheng He.

Location
The archeological, historical, religious, and cultural village, Duhabi is situated in Mithila. It is 15 km east from the historical, religious and cultural town Janakpur and at similar distance from a small business town Jaynagar (India). Nepal railway passes through the village. The archeological remains sites and the temples are at stone throw distance from the railway station.

Sites
 Dharohar [locally named archeological sites]
 Five temples with excavated idols of God and Goddess.
 500 year old banyan tree and many year old peepal trees.
 Cultural events and song, music, art traditional musical instruments.
 Indo-Nepal border – A small market towns stretched either sides of the border land

References

External links
UN map of the municipalities of Dhanusa District

Populated places in Dhanusha District